Robert William Brown (15 December 1850 – 8 December 1934) was a New Zealand cricketer. He played one first-class match for Otago in 1870/71. In later life, Brown was the founder of the Farmer's Co-operative Insurance Association of New Zealand. He was born at Dunedin and educated at Otago Boys' High School.

References

External links
 

1850 births
1934 deaths
New Zealand cricketers
Otago cricketers
Cricketers from Dunedin